Tarfaya is a province in the Moroccan economic region of Laâyoune-Sakia El Hamra, which includes the southwestern part of the territory of Morocco as of before 1975, and the northern part of the disputed territory of Western Sahara. Its population in 2004 was 10420. Its main town is Tarfaya.

In the north-east of the province, Khenifiss National Park is located.

Subdivisions
The province is divided administratively into the following:

Notes :
 Before 2009, these communes were part of the  Laâyoune Province.
 (eh) The two communes of Daoura and El Hagounia are located for their largest part in Western Sahara.

References

 
Tarfaya Province
Tarfaya